A  is a specialized weapon that was used by police in Edo period Japan (1603 – 1868).

History
In feudal Japan, it was a crime punishable by death to bring a sword into the shōguns palace. This law applied to almost everyone, including the palace guards. Due to this prohibition, several kinds of non-bladed weapons were carried by palace guards. The jitte proved particularly effective and evolved to become the symbol of a palace guard's exalted position.

In Edo-period Japan, the jitte was a substitute for a badge, and it represented someone on official business. It was carried by all levels of police officers, including high-ranking samurai police officials and low-rank samurai law enforcement officers (called okappiki or doshin). Other high-ranking samurai officials carried a jitte as a badge of office, including hotel, rice and grain inspectors (aratame). The jitte is the subject of the Japanese martial art of jittejutsu.

Description and technique

Jitte may have a small pointed tip or blade attached to the handle (tsuka) and hidden in the shaft (boshin). Jitte could be highly decorated with all manner of inlays and designs or very plain and basic depending on the status of the owner and the jitte's intended use. Jitte could range in length from around 12 to over 24 in. A popular misconception is that the kagi is used to catch a sword. It could possibly be used for this purpose, but the hook's proximity to the hand would make it rather dangerous; a more likely use for the hook would be to capture and arrest the blade after blocking it with the boshin. The kagis more common use is to hook into clothing or parts of the body like the nose or mouth, or to push into joints or other weak points on the body. It also could be used to hook the thumb while holding the weapon backwards, to allow different techniques such as punches and blocks, very similarly to a sai. The jitte can also be used in much the same manner as other short sticks or batons, to strike large muscle groups and aid in joint manipulation.

Parts of the jitte

Boshin, the main shaft of the jitte which could be smooth or multi-sided. The boshin of most jitte were usually iron, but some were made from wood.
Sentan, the tip or point of the jitte.
Kagi, the hook or guard protruding from the side of the jitte. Jitte may have more than one kagi, with some jitte having two or three kagi.
Kikuza ("chrysanthemum seat"): if the kagi is attached to the boshin through a hole in the boshin, the protrusion on the opposite side is called a kikuza.
Tsuka, the handle of the jitte, which could be wrapped or covered with various materials, or left plain.
Tsukamaki, the wrapping on the handle (tsuka). Materials such as ray skin (same), leather, and cord were used.
Kan, the ring or loop at the pommel of the tsuka. A cord or tassel could be tied to the kan.  Also note its 'skull cracker' design.
 Tsuba, a hand guard present on some types of jitte.
 Koshirae. Jitte can occasionally be found housed in a sword-type case hiding the jitte from view entirely. This type of jitte can have the same parts and fittings as a sword, including seppa, tsuba, menuki, koiguchi, kojiri, nakago, mekugi-ana and mei.

Other jitte types and similar weapons
Karakuri jitte
Marohoshi
Naeshi or nayashi jitte have no hook or kagi.
Tekkan
Hachiwara

Gallery

References

External links

 Samurai Weapons, Samurai Armors and the Samurai way of life.
 Don Cunningham's web site, Edo period police weapons and tactics 
 ROLES AND TECHNIQUES OF THE POLICE DURING THE EDO PERIOD (1603–1867)’ by Dr. Kacem Zoughari

Clubs and truncheons of Japan
Samurai clubs and truncheons
Samurai police weapons